Yasmine Belmadi (26 January 1976 – 18 July 2009) was a French actor of Algerian parents. He appeared in 13 films, and had completed his final role, in a television production, the day before his death.

Biography
Belmadi grew up in the northern Paris suburb of Aubervilliers. His first screen appearance was in 1997, when he played a young gay beur in the short film Les Corps ouverts, directed by Sébastien Lifshitz.  The film was a critical success, winning two awards (the Prix Kodak and the Prix Jean Vigo) in the category of short film in 1998. Other notable films in which Belmadi appeared include Les Amants criminels, Wild Side, Beur blanc rouge and Grande École.

Belmadi played a lead rôle in the 2009 film Adieu Gary, directed by Nassim Amaouche, which won the International Critics' Week Grand Prix at the 2009 Cannes Film Festival. Adieu Gary went on general release in France on 22 July 2009, four days after Belmadi's death. Belmadi's last rôle was in Pigalle, a production for French television channel Canal+, which he completed on 17 July 2009.

Death
On 18 July 2009, at 6 a.m., the scooter which Belmadi was riding collided with a lamp post at the intersection of the Pont de Sully and the Boulevard Henri IV in Paris. He was taken to the Pitié-Salpêtrière Hospital, where he died from his injuries, aged 33.

Filmography 
 1997: Les Corps ouverts - dir. Sébastien Lifshitz
 1998: Les Terres froides - dir. Sébastien Lifshitz (TV film)
 1999: Les Amants criminels - dir. François Ozon
 2000: Un dérangement considérable - dir. Bernard Stora
 2000: Les Gens en maillot de bain ne sont pas (forcément) superficiels - dir. Éric Assous
 2003: Filles uniques - dir. Pierre Jolivet
 2003: Qui a tué Bambi? - dir. Gilles Marchand
 2004: Wild Side - dir. Sébastien Lifshitz
 2004: Beur blanc rouge - dir. Mahmoud Zemmouri
 2004: Grande École - dir. Robert Salis
 2005: Au petit matin - dir. Xavier Gens
 2008: Coupable - dir. Laetitia Masson
 2009: Adieu Gary - dir. Nassim Amaouche
 2009: Pigalle - dir. Hervé Hadmar (TV film)

References

1976 births
2009 deaths
People from Aubervilliers
French male film actors
French male television actors
French people of Algerian descent
Road incident deaths in France
20th-century French male actors
21st-century French male actors